Patricia García may refer to:
Patricia García (rugby union), Spanish rugby union player
 Patricia J. Garcia, Peruvian professor
 Patricia García (gymnast) (born 1957), Mexican gymnast